Gayon may refer to:

People
 Fernando Cos-Gayón (1825–1898), Spanish journalist and politician
 Gayon Evans Evans (born 1990), Jamaican sprinter
 Roberto Gayón Márquez (born 1905), Mexican football forward

Places
 Gayon, Pyrénées-Atlantiques, France

Other
 Gayon language, extinct language of western Venezuela